The 1923 Richmond Spiders football team was an American football team that represented the University of Richmond as an independent during the 1923 college football season. Led by tenth-year head coach, Frank Dobson, Richmond compiled a record of 3–5.

Schedule

References

Richmond
Richmond Spiders football seasons
Richmond Spiders football